Hibbertia robur is a species of flowering plant in the family Dilleniaceae and is endemic to the west of Western Australia. It is a strongly erect shrub with linear leaves and a few yellow flowers arranged singly at the ends of branchlets, the flowers with eight to eleven stamens all on one side of the two carpels.

Description
There are eight to eleven stamens all on one side of the two carpels, each carpel with two ovules. Flowering has been recorded from May to September.

Taxonomy
Hibbertia robur was first formally described in 2014 by Kevin Thiele in the journal Nuytsia from specimens he collected near Arrowsmith in 2014. The specific epithet (robur) means "strength", referring to the habit, branchlets, leaves and sepals.

Distribution and habitat
This species mainly grows in kwongan and has been recorded from the area between Dongara, Mingenew, Three Springs and Eneabba in the Geraldton Sandplains biogeographic region in the west of Western Australia.

Conservation status
Hibbertia robur is classified as "not threatened" by the Government of Western Australia Department of Biodiversity, Conservation and Attractions.

See also
List of Hibbertia species

References

robur
Flora of Western Australia
Plants described in 2014
Taxa named by Kevin Thiele